This is the discography of American disco and soul singer Amii Stewart.

Albums

Studio albums

Live albums

Remix albums

Compilation albums

Singles

References

Discographies of American artists
Pop music discographies
Soul music discographies
Disco discographies